The Thomson-Houston Electric Company was a manufacturing company which was one of the precursors of the General Electric company.

History
The Thomson-Houston Electric Company was formed in 1882 in the United States when a group of Lynn, Massachusetts investors led by Charles A. Coffin bought out Elihu Thomson and Edwin Houston's American Electric Company from their New Britain, Connecticut, investors.  The company moved its operations to a new building on Western Ave. in Lynn, Massachusetts, because many of the investors were shoe manufacturers from Lynn.

Charles A. Coffin led the company and organized its finances, marketing, and sales operations. Elwin W. Rice organized the manufacturing facilities, and Elihu Thomson ran the Model Room which was a precursor to the industrial research lab.

In 1884 Thomson-Houston International Company was organized to promote international sales.

In 1885 the Lynn G.A.R. Hall was constructed using electric incandescent lighting by Thomson-Houston.

In 1888 Thomson-Houston supplied the Lynn and Boston Railroad with the generation and propulsion equipment for the Highland Circuit in Lynn, the first electric streetcar in Massachusetts.

In 1889 Thomson-Houston bought out the Brush Company (founded by Charles F. Brush) which resolved the arc lamp and dynamo patent disputes between them.

Thomson-Houston was later merged with the Edison General Electric Company of Schenectady, New York (arranged by J. P. Morgan), to form the General Electric Company in 1892, with plants in Lynn and Schenectady, both of which remain to this day as the two original GE factories.

International companies

British Thomson-Houston
British Thomson-Houston (BTH) was created as a subsidiary of (American) General Electric in May 1896. It was previously known as Laing, Wharton, and Down which was founded in 1886. 
BTH became part of Associated Electrical Industries (AEI) in 1928, which saw BTH merged with its rival Metropolitan-Vickers. 
This deal made AEI the largest military contractor of the British Empire during the '30s and the '40s, so during World War II.
AEI would itself be acquired by the General Electric Company plc or GEC in 1967. GEC demerged its defense businesses in 1999 to become Marconi plc and Marconi Corporation plc, now Telent plc.

Compagnie Française Thomson-Houston
In 1893, the Compagnie Française Thomson-Houston (CFTH) was formed in Paris, a sister company to GE in the United States. It is from this company that Alstom would evolve. A demerger in 1999 formed what is now Technicolor SA and Thomson-CSF (now Thales Group).

References and sources
References

Sources
Hammond, John Winthrop. Men and Volts, the Story of General Electric published 1941. 436 pages.
Carlson, W. Bernard.  Innovation as a Social Process: Elihu Thomson and the Rise of General Electric, 1870-1900 (Cambridge: Cambridge University Press, 1991).
Woodbury, David O.  Elihu Thomson, Beloved Scientist (Boston: Museum of Science, 1944)
Haney, John L.  The Elihu Thomson Collection American Philosophical Society Yearbook 1944.

1882 establishments in Massachusetts
Energy companies established in 1882
Manufacturing companies established in 1882
American companies established in 1882
1892 mergers and acquisitions
1892 disestablishments in Massachusetts
Energy companies disestablished in 1892
Manufacturing companies disestablished in 1892
American companies disestablished in 1892
Electronics companies of the United States
General Electric subsidiaries
Technicolor SA
Companies based in Lynn, Massachusetts
Defunct manufacturing companies based in Massachusetts